"You Could've Heard a Heart Break" is a song written by Marc Rossi, and recorded by American country music artist Johnny Lee.  It was released in August 1984 as the lead single from the album Workin' for a Livin.  The song was Lee's fifth and final number one on the country chart.  The single spent one week at number one and spent a total of fourteen weeks on the country chart.

Chart performance

References

Johnny Lee (singer) songs
1984 singles
Song recordings produced by Jimmy Bowen
Warner Records singles
1984 songs